The Kalanguyskoye mine is a large mine located in the south-eastern Russia in Primorsky Krai. Kalanguyskoye represents one of the largest fluorite reserves in Russia having estimated reserves of 6.3 million tonnes of ore grading 60% fluorite.

References 

Fluorite mines in Russia